This is a list of flag bearers who have represented Greece at the Olympics.

Flag bearers carry the national flag of their country at the opening ceremony of the Olympic Games.

See also
Greece at the Olympics

References

Greece at the Olympics
Greece
Olympic flagbearers